Livingston Municipal Airport  is a city-owned, public-use airport located five nautical miles (5.8 statute miles, 9.2 km) southwest of the central business district of Livingston, a city in Polk County, Texas, United States. According to the FAA's National Plan of Integrated Airport Systems for 2009–2013, it is categorized as a general aviation facility.

The airport is located in West Livingston along Farm to Market Road 350 South and along the eastern side of Lake Livingston. The Texas Department of Criminal Justice Polunsky Unit (home to the state's death row) is located on the other side of FM 350.

Facilities and aircraft 
It has one runway designated 12/30 with an asphalt surface measuring 3,700 by 60 feet (1,128 x 18 m).

For the 12-month period ending May 13, 2008, the airport had 7,800 general aviation aircraft operations, an average of 21 per day. At that time there were 28 aircraft based at this airport: 86% single-engine, 7% multi-engine and 7% ultralight.

References

External links 

 Livingston Municipal Airport page at City of Livingston website
  at Texas DOT Airport Directory
 Aerial image as of January 1995 from USGS The National Map
 
 

Airports in Texas
Buildings and structures in Polk County, Texas
Transportation in Polk County, Texas